The Stockton Ordance Depot was a World War II vehicle repair facility, supply depot, and camp for German and Italian prisoners of war.  The installation was also used as a USAF radar station and a DLA Defense Distribution Center.

Acquisition
Parcels A-2-A, A-2-B, and A-2-C totaling  were acquired "from the Estate of Frank Shackleford Boggs on May 11, 1942"; and

Naval Supply Annex Stockton
The Naval Supply Annex Stockton had four warehouses and storage yard built in 1945.

Radar station
The Stockton Bomb Plot was the Stockton Ordnance Depot callsign of the 3903rd Radar Bomb Scoring Group's Detachment I operating the Radar Bomb Scoring station for tracking bombers and evaluating aircrews' performance during simulated Cold War bomb runs for training/proficiency.  Detachment I moved to Charlotte, North Carolina in 1950 and later becoming Detachment 4 of the 10th Radar Bomb Scoring Squadron at Houston, Texas , and RBS operations for California were subsequently performed by the 11 RBS Squadron's Det 2 at Cheli Air Force Station (Los Angeles Bomb Plot) and Det 4 near McClellan AFB (Sacramento Bomb Plot).

Stockton Air Force Station
Stockton Air Force Station was a  site designated on March 2, 1955, after "portions of Parcels A-2-C and C-1 along with Parcels D-1, and E-1 were transferred to the Department of the Air Force on December 1, 1954."  The USAF began the transfer of the site on December 14, 1956; and the property was conveyed after June 1967 payment by the Port of Stockton.

Defense Distribution Center San Joaquin

In 2008, "the Port of Stockton [was] attempting to acquire Rough and Ready Island from the Government."

World War 2
1,500 German prisoners were held at the depot from May 1944 till June 1946.

See also
 Barbwire Bowl Classic
San Joaquin Depot
Sharpe Facility
Tracy Facility

References

Installations of the U.S. Department of Defense
United States automatic tracking radar stations
World War II prisoner of war camps in the United States
1942 establishments in California
Stockton, California
Military installations established in 1942